Tarucus rosacea, the Mediterranean Pierrot or Mediterranean tiger blue, is a butterfly in the family Lycaenidae. It is found in Mauritania, Senegal, the Gambia, Guinea, Burkina Faso, northern Ivory Coast, northern Ghana, northern Nigeria, Niger, northern Cameroon, Chad, Sudan, Ethiopia, northern Uganda, north-western Kenya, Somalia, Djibouti and Arabia. The habitat consists of Sudan savanna and the Sahel.

Adults feed from the flowers of Ziziphus species.

The larvae feed on Ziziphus jujuba. They are associated with ants of the Plagiolepis, Camponotus and Monomorium genera.

References

Butterflies described in 1885
Tarucus
Butterflies of Africa